Mount Peterson is a small mountain rising above the ice surface 22 nautical miles (41 km) northwest of Mount Rex, Palmer Land. The feature lies within a group of nunataks first sighted and photographed on November 23, 1935, by Lincoln Ellsworth. The area was explored by the Ronne Antarctic Research Expedition (RARE) (1947–48) under Finn Ronne, who named the mountain for Harries-Clichy Peterson, physicist with the expedition.

References

External links

Mountains of Palmer Land